Marlantes is a surname. Notable people with the surname include:

Karl Marlantes (born 1944), American author and Vietnam War veteran
Liz Marlantes (born 1975), American broadcast journalist

See also 
Celada Marlantes,  is a locality in the municipality of Campoo de Enmedio, in the northern Spanish autonomous community of Cantabria